Mamagaru is a 1991 Telugu-language drama film directed by Muthyala Subbaiah. It stars Dasari Narayana Rao, Vinod Kumar and Yamuna in the main roles. The film is a remake of the Tamil film Naan Pudicha Mappillai.

Plot
Vijay (Vinod Kumar) is the president of a village. He rescues the simple Satheyya (Dasari Narayana Rao) from an attack by thieves. Vijay later marries Satheyya's daughter Lakshmi (Yamuna) against the parental wishes of Kanthamma (Nirmalamma), who wants him to marry his niece Rani (Aishwarya). Vijay also brings his father-in-law to live with him. These decisions anger his brother-in-law Pothuraju (Kota Srinivasa Rao), who plots to discredit Vijay's family. Lakshmi accidentally dies in a bomb explosion which was planted to make a ditch. Satheyya feels sad that his son-in-law could not forget his daughter. He persuades him to marry Rani. Rani also admires him because of his simplicity and love. But Puthuraju is not happy about all the attention he gets. Satheyya is driven out of Vijay's house after Pothuraju accuses the old man of being a womaniser. Vijay finally sees through Pothuraju's evil designs, but not before Satheyya commits suicide.

Characters
The beggar character played by Babu Mohan gained a lot of popularity for him. He had to resign to his government job and turn into a full-time actor.

Cast
 Dasari Narayana Rao as Satteyya
 Vinod Kumar as Vijay Kumar
 Yamuna as Lakshmi
 Aishwarya as Rani
 Annapoorna as Vijay's elder sister
 Nirmalamma as Kantamma
 Kota Srinivasa Rao as Poturaju
 Babu Mohan as beggar

Soundtrack
The music was composed by Raj–Koti.

Awards
Nandi Awards -1991

Best Actor - Dasari Narayana Rao
Best Supporting Actor - Vinod Kumar
Best Male Comedian - Babu Mohan

References

External links

1991 films
Indian drama films
1990s Telugu-language films
Films scored by Raj–Koti
Telugu remakes of Tamil films
Films directed by Muthyala Subbaiah